Elachista ibericella is a moth of the family Elachistidae. It is found in Spain.

References

ibericella
Moths described in 1995
Moths of Europe